The 2022 Pittsburgh Pirates season was the franchise's 141st season overall, 136th season as a member of the National League, and 22nd season at PNC Park. 

On December 2, 2021, Commissioner of Baseball Rob Manfred announced a lockout of players, following expiration of the collective bargaining agreement (CBA) between the league and the Major League Baseball Players Association (MLBPA). On March 10, 2022, the MLB and MLBPA agreed to a new collective bargaining agreement, thus ending the lockout. Opening Day was played on April 7. Although MLB previously announced that several series would be cancelled due to the lockout, the agreement provides for a 162-game season, with originally canceled games to be made up via doubleheaders. The Pirates set a major league record during the season: most games to start a season without a victory for the starting Pirates pitcher, who did not record a win until May 9, the 28th game of the season.

The team experienced another heavily losing season, finishing with a record of 62-100 (.383), improving upon the prior season's record by only one win. They were 31 games behind the NL Central-winning Cardinals. Despite the team's shortcomings, the team swept the Los Angeles Dodgers at Dodger Stadium for the first time in franchise history. Additionally, shortstop Oneil Cruz recorded the fastest-hit ball in Statcast history with a 122.4 mph single in a 14-2 loss against the Atlanta Braves. Because the eventual National League champions, the Phillies, reached the playoffs for the first time in 11 years, the Pirates now hold the National League's longest active playoff drought, not having made the playoffs since 2015. The Pirates finished tied for fourth place in the NL Central.

Offseason

Lockout 

The expiration of the league's collective bargaining agreement (CBA) with the Major League Baseball Players Association occurred on December 1, 2021 with no new agreement in place. As a result, the team owners voted unanimously to lockout the players stopping all free agency and trades. 

The parties came to an agreement on a new CBA on March 10, 2022.

Rule changes 
Pursuant to the new CBA, several new rules were instituted for the 2022 season. The National League will adopt the designated hitter full-time, a draft lottery will be implemented, the postseason will expand from ten teams to twelve, and advertising patches will appear on player uniforms and helmets for the first time.

Regular season

National League Central

National League Wild Card

Game Log

{{Game log section start|hide=y|style=background:#FDB827;color:black;|title=April: 9–12 (Home: 5–6; Away: 4–6)|#|Date|Opponent|Score|Win|Loss|Save|Attendance|Record|Streak}}
|- style="background:#fbb;"
| 1 || April 7 || @ Cardinals || 0–9 || Wainwright (1–0) || Brubaker (0–1) || — || 46,256 || 0–1 || L1
|- style="background:#fbb;" 
| 2 || April 9 || @ Cardinals || 2–6 || Whitley (1–0) || Keller (0–1) || — || 45,025 || 0–2 || L2
|- style="background:#bfb;" 
| 3 || April 10 || @ Cardinals || 9–4 || Yajure (1–0) || Matz (0–1) || — || 40,027 || 1–2 || W1
|- style="background:#bbb;" 
| — || April 11 || @ Cardinals || colspan=7| Postponed (rain); Makeup: June 14
|- style="background:#fbb;" 
| 4 || April 12 || Cubs || 1–2 || Smyly (1–0) || Quintana (0–1) || Robertson (2) || 34,458 || 1–3 || L1
|- style="background:#bfb;" 
| 5 || April 13 || Cubs || 6–2 || Peters (1–0) || Hendricks (0–1) || Crowe (1) || 9,122 || 2–3 || W1
|- style="background:#bfb;" 
| 6 || April 14 || Nationals || 9–4 || Contreras (1–0) || Adon (0–2) || — || 9,266 || 3–3 || W2
|- style="background:#fbb;" 
| 7 || April 15 || Nationals || 2–7 || Fedde (1–0) || Keller (0–2) || — || 13,076 || 3–4 || L1
|- style="background:#bfb;" 
| 8 || April 16 || Nationals || 6–4 || Peters (2–0) || Rogers (1–1) || — || 8,676 || 4–4 || W1
|- style="background:#bfb;" 
| 9 || April 17 || Nationals || 5–3 || Hembree (1–0) || Cishek (0–1) || Bednar (1) || 8,735 || 5–4 || W2
|- style="background:#fbb;" 
| 10 || April 18 || @ Brewers || 1–6 || Lauer (1–0) || Thompson (0–1) || — || 21,512 || 5–5 || L1
|- style="background:#fbb;" 
| 11 || April 19 || @ Brewers || 2–5 || Burnes (1–0) || Brubaker (0–2) || Hader (5) || 22,747 || 5–6 || L2
|- style="background:#fbb;" 
| 12 || April 20 || @ Brewers || 2–4 || Woodruff (2–1) || Keller (0–3) || Hader (6) || 20,790 || 5–7 || L3
|- style="background:#bfb;" 
| 13 || April 21 || @ Cubs || 4–3 || Crowe (1–0) || Roberts (0–1) || Stratton (1) || 32,341 || 6–7 || W1
|- style="background:#bfb;" 
| 14 || April 22 || @ Cubs || 4–2 || De Jong (1–0) || Smyly (1–1) || Stratton (2) || 25,005 || 7–7 || W2
|- style="background:#fbb;" 
| 15 || April 23 || @ Cubs || 0–21 || Hendricks (1–1) || Thompson (0–2) || — || 39,917 || 7–8 || L1
|- style="background:#bfb;" 
| 16 || April 24 || @ Cubs || 4–3 || Peters (3–0) || Steele (1–2) || Bednar (2) || 28,387 || 8–8 || W1
|- style="background:#fbb;" 
| 17 || April 26 || Brewers || 8–12 || Suter (1–0) || Fletcher (0–1) || Hader (9) || 8,493 || 8–9 || L1
|- style="background:#fbb;" 
| 18 || April 27 || Brewers || 1–3 || Gott (1–0) || Crowe (1–1) || Hader (10) || 8,331 || 8–10 || L2
|- style="background:#fbb;" 
| 19 || April 28 || Brewers || 2–3 || Milner (2–0) || Stratton (0–1) || Williams (1) || 8,332 || 8–11 || L3
|- style="background:#fbb;" 
| 20 || April 29 || Padres || 3–7 || Darvish (2–1) || Thompson (0–3) || — || 9,755 || 8–12 || L4
|- style="background:#bfb;" 
| 21 || April 30 || Padres || 7–6  || Stratton (1–1) || García (0–1) || — || 20,483 || 9–12 || W1
|- 

|- style="background:#bfb;" 
| 49 || June 1 || @ Dodgers || 8–4 || De Jong (2–0) || White (1–1) || — || 39,324 || 22–27 || W3
|- style="background:#fbb;"
| 50 || June 3 || Diamondbacks || 6–8 || Kelly (4–3) || Brubaker (0–5) || Melancon (11) || 16,444 || 22–28 || L1
|- style="background:#bfb;" 
| 51 || June 4 || Diamondbacks || 2–1 || Stratton (3–2) || Melancon (1–6) || — || 19,149 || 23–28 || W1
|- style="background:#bfb;" 
| 52 || June 5 || Diamondbacks || 3–0 || Thompson (3–4) || Gallen (4–1) || Bednar (10) || 11,796 || 24–28 || W2
|- style="background:#fbb;"
| 53 || June 7 || Tigers || 3–5 || Skubal (5–2) || Quintana (1–3) || Soto (11) || 10,214 || 24–29 || L1
|- style="background:#fbb;"
| 54 || June 8 || Tigers || 1–3 || Vest (1–1) || Crowe (2–3) || Soto (12) || 11,723 || 24–30 || L2
|- style="background:#fbb;"
| 55 || June 9 || @ Braves || 1–3 || Fried (6–2) || Brubaker (0–6) || Jansen (16) || 39,336 || 24–31 || L3
|- style="background:#fbb;"
| 56 || June 10 || @ Braves || 2–4 || Strider (2–2) || Contreras (1–1) || Jansen (17) || 41,404 || 24–32 || L4
|- style="background:#fbb;" 
| 57 || June 11 || @ Braves || 4–10 || Chavez (1–1) || Underwood Jr. (0–2) || — || 41,219 || 24–33 || L5
|- style="background:#fbb;"
| 58 || June 12 || @ Braves || 3–5 || Wright (7–3) || Quintana (1–4) || Jansen (18) || 35,446 || 24–34 || L6
|- style="background:#fbb;"
| 59 || June 13 || @ Cardinals || 5–7 || Gallegos (2–2) || Stratton (3–3) || Helsley (5) || 37,398 || 24–35 || L7
|- style="background:#fbb;"
| 60 || June 14  || @ Cardinals || 1–3 || Liberatore (2–1) || Brubaker (0–7) || Gallegos (9) || 31,193 || 24–36 || L8
|- style="background:#fbb;"
| 61 || June 14  || @ Cardinals || 1–9 || Mikolas (5–4) || Wilson (0–4) || — || 33,977 || 24–37 || L9
|- style="background:#bfb;" 
| 62 || June 15 || @ Cardinals || 6–4 || Crowe (3–3) || Pallante (2–1) || Bednar (11) || 38,658 || 25–37 || W1
|- style="background:#fbb;" 
| 63 || June 17 || Giants || 0–2 || Rodón (6–4) || Thompson (3–5) || Doval (10) || 19,075 || 25–38 || L1
|- style="background:#fbb;"
| 64 || June 18 || Giants || 5–7 || Wood (5–5) || Crowe (3–4) || Doval (11) || 26,041 || 25–39 || L2
|- style="background:#bfb;" 
| 65 || June 19 || Giants || 4–3 || Bednar (3–1) || Rogers (0–3) || — || 23,905 || 26–39 || W1
|- style="background:#bfb;" 
| 66 || June 20 || Cubs || 12–1 || Brubaker (1–7) || Kilian (0–2) || — || 11,312 || 27–39 || W2
|- style="background:#bfb;" 
| 67 || June 21 || Cubs || 7–1 || Contreras (2–1) || Swarmer (1–3) || — || 11,254 || 28–39 || W3
|- style="background:#fbb;" 
| 68 || June 22 || Cubs || 5–14 || Thompson (7–2) || Eickhoff (0–1) || — || 14,083 || 28–40 || L1
|- style="background:#bfb;" 
| 69 || June 23 || Cubs || 8–7  || Stratton (4–3) || Effross (1–3) || — || 14,529 || 29–40 || W1
|- style="background:#fbb;" 
| 70 || June 24 || @ Rays || 3–4  || Adam (1–2) || De Los Santos (0–1) || — || 10,542 || 29–41 || L1
|- style="background:#fbb;" 
| 71 || June 25 || @ Rays || 5–6 || Garza Jr. (1–2) || Bednar (3–2) || — || 15,203 || 29–42 || L2
|- style="background:#fbb;" 
| 72 || June 26 || @ Rays || 2–4 || McClanahan (8–3) || Beede (0–1) || Raley (4) || 13,364 || 29–43 || L3
|- style="background:#fbb;" 
| 73 || June 27 || @ Nationals || 2–3 || Edwards Jr. (2–1) || Stratton (4–4) || Finnegan (1) || 18,213 || 29–44 || L4
|- style="background:#fbb;" 
| 74 || June 28 || @ Nationals || 1–3 || Corbin (4–10) || Crowe (3–5) || Rainey (11) || 22,575 || 29–45 || L5
|- style="background:#bfb;"
| 75 || June 29 || @ Nationals || 8–7 || De Jong (3–0) || Edwards Jr. (2–2) || De Los Santos (1) || 19,870 || 30–45 || W1
|- style="background:#bfb;" 
| 76 || June 30 || Brewers || 8–7 || Brubaker (2–7) || Suter (1–2) || De Los Santos (2) || 14,134 || 31–45 || W2
|- 

|- style="background:#bfb;"
| 103 || August 2 || Brewers || 5–3 || Holderman (5–0) || Burnes (8–5) || Crowe (3) || 12,401 || 41–62 || W1
|- style="background:#bfb;"
| 104 || August 3 || Brewers || 8–7 || Crowe (4–6) || Williams (2–1) || — || 13,084 || 42–62 || W2
|- style="background:#bfb;"
| 105 || August 4 || Brewers || 5–4  || Underwood Jr. (1–3) || Bush (2–2) || — || 13,485 || 43–62 || W3
|- style="background:#fbb;" 
| 106 || August 5 || @ Orioles || 0–1 || Kremer (4–3) || Keller (3–8) || Bautista (7) || 25,613 || 43–63 || L1
|- style="background:#fbb;" 
| 107 || August 6 || @ Orioles || 3–6 || Voth (2–1) || Brubaker (2–10) || — || 41,086 || 43–64 || L2
|- style="background:#bfb;"
| 108 || August 7 || @ Orioles || 8–1 || Wilson (2–6) || Watkins (4–2) || — || 16,714 || 44–64 || W1
|- style="background:#fbb;"
| 109 || August 8 || @ Diamondbacks || 0–3 || Gallen (7–2) || Bañuelos (0–1) || Kennedy (7) || 11,275 || 44–65 || L1
|- style="background:#fbb;"
| 110 || August 9 || @ Diamondbacks || 4–6 || Henry (1–1) || Thompson (3–9) || Melancon (16) || 12,901 || 44–66 || L2
|- style="background:#bfb;"
| 111 || August 10 || @ Diamondbacks || 6–4 || Keller (4–8) || Bumgarner (6–11) || Stout (1) || 12,714 || 45–66 || W1
|- style="background:#fbb;"  
| 112 || August 11 || @ Diamondbacks || 3–9 || Ginkel (1–0) || De Jong (4–1) || — || 12,725 || 45–67 ||L1
|- style="background:#fbb;"
| 113 || August 12 || @ Giants || 3–5 || Rodón (11–6) || Wilson (2–7) || Doval (16) || 33,328 || 45–68 ||L2
|- style="background:#fbb;"
| 114 || August 13 || @ Giants || 0–2 || Webb (11–5) || Beede (1–2) || Doval (17) || 38,049 || 45–69 || L3
|- style="background:#fbb;"
| 115 || August 14 || @ Giants || 7–8 || Doval (4–5) || Crowe (4–7) || — || 36,471 || 45–70 || L4
|- style="background:#fbb;"
| 116 || August 16 || Red Sox || 3–5 || Pivetta (9–9) || Keller (4–9) || Barnes (3) || 19,387 || 45–71 || L5
|- style="background:#fbb;"
| 117 || August 17 || Red Sox || 3–8 || Hill (5–5) || Contreras (3–3) || — || 15,231 || 45–72 || L6
|- style="background:#bfb;"
| 118 || August 18 || Red Sox || 8–2 || Brubaker (3–10) || Winckowski (5–6) || — || 20,991 || 46–72 || W1
|- style="background:#bfb;"
| 119 || August 19 || Reds || 5–4 || Crowe (5–7) || Kuhnel (2–2) || — || 17,706 || 47–72 || W2
|- style="background:#fbb;"
| 120 || August 20 || Reds || 1–10 || Dunn (1–1) || Beede (1–3) || — || 31,761 || 47–73 || L1
|- style="background:#fbb;"
| 121 || August 21 || Reds || 5–9 || Minor (2–10) || Thompson (3–10) || — || 15,046 || 47–74 || L2
|- style="background:#fbb;"
| 122 || August 22 || Braves || 1–2 || Odorizzi (5–5) || Contreras (3–4) || Jansen (29) || 11,231 || 47–75 || L3
|- style="background:#fbb;"
| 123 || August 23 || Braves || 1–6 || Fried (12–4) || Brubaker (3–11) || — || 13,367 || 47–76 || L4
|- style="background:#fbb;"
| 124 || August 24 || Braves || 2–14 || Wright (16–5) || Keller (4–10) || — || 12,060 || 47–77 || L5
|- style="background:#fbb;" 
| 125 || August 26 || @ Phillies || 4–7 || Falter (2–3) || Wilson (2–8) || Hand (5) || 30,546 || 47–78 || L6
|- style="background:#fbb;"
| 126 || August 27 || @ Phillies || 0–6 || Gibson (9–5) || Beede (1–4) || — || 37,105 || 47–79 || L7
|- style="background:#bfb;"
| 127 || August 28 || @ Phillies || 5–0 || Contreras (4–4) || Syndergaard (8–9) || — || 30,355 || 48–79 || W1
|- style="background:#fbb;" 
| 128 || August 29 || @ Brewers || 5–7 || Williams (5–3) || Crowe (5–8) || — || 23,009 || 48–80 || L1
|- style="background:#bfb;"
| 129 || August 30 || @ Brewers || 4–2 || Bañuelos (1–1) || Boxberger (3–3) || De Jong (1) || 24,764 || 49–80 || W1
|- style="background:#fbb;"
| 130 || August 31 || @ Brewers || 1–6 || Rogers (3–6) || Yajure (1–1) || — || 25,240 || 49–81 || L1
|- 

|- style="background:#fbb;" 
| 158 || October 1 || @ Cardinals || 3–13 || Montgomery (9–6) || Ortiz (0–2) || — || 46,365 || 59–99 || L2
|- style="background:#bfb;"
| 159 || October 2 || @ Cardinals || 7–5 || De Jong (6–2) || Wainwright (11–12) || Bednar (19) || 46,680 || 60–99 || W1
|- style="background:#bfb;"
| 160 || October 3 || Cardinals || 3–2 || Ramírez (4–1) || Gallegos (3–6) || — || 12,702 || 61–99 || W2
|- style="background:#fbb;" 
| 161 || October 4 || Cardinals || 7–8  || Stratton (10–4) || De Jong (6–3) || — || 12,842 || 61–100 || L1
|- style="background:#bfb;"
| 162 || October 5 || Cardinals || 5–3 || Bañuelos (2–1) || Liberatore (2–2) || Ramírez' (1) || 15,319 || 62–100 || W1
|-

|- style="text-align:center;"
| Legend:       = Win       = Loss       = PostponementBold = Pirates team memberRoster

 Statistics 
 Batting (through October 5, 2022)Players in bold are on the active roster.Note: G = Games played; AB = At bats; R = Runs; H = Hits; 2B = Doubles; 3B = Triples; HR = Home runs; RBI = Runs batted in; SB = Stolen bases; BB = Walks; K = Strikeouts; AVG = Batting average; OBP = On-base percentage; SLG = Slugging percentage; TB = Total basesSource

 Pitching (through October 5, 2022)Players in bold are on the active roster.Note: W = Wins; L = Losses; ERA = Earned run average; WHIP = Walks plus hits per inning pitched; G = Games pitched; GS = Games started; SV = Saves; IP = Innings pitched; H = Hits allowed; R = Runs allowed; ER = Earned runs allowed; BB = Walks allowed; K = Strikeouts''

Source

Farm system

Notes

References

External links
Pittsburgh Pirates 2022 schedule at MLB.com

Pittsburgh Pirates seasons
Pittsburgh Pirates
Pittsburgh Pirates
2020s in Pittsburgh